Muzna – whose name means Cloud of rain in Andalusian Arabic – was a slave-concubine of Emir Abdullah of Córdoba and a member of his imperial harem. She was the mother of Caliph Abd al-Rahman III and was therefore given the title umm walad, which used to be given to slave-concubines who had children.

She is of Basque origin (or Frankish, according to French historian André Clot) and was initially a Christian before converting to Islam. As the granddaughter of Fortún Garcés Cajal, she is descended from the royal family of Navarre, the Aristas.  She died in 968. 

In his treatises and works such as The Ring of the Dove, the polymath Ibn Hazm named her after her own name, Hazm, and seemed to emphasize family ties between him and her.

See also 
 History of concubinage in the Muslim world

References 

10th-century women
Basque people
People from the Caliphate of Córdoba
968 deaths
Slaves from al-Andalus
Women from al-Andalus
Slave concubines